The Kaive Oak is an oak tree (Quercus robur) in Sēme Parish, Tukums Municipality, Latvia. It is situated about 500 m from Kaive Manor, in a meadow. It is protected as a natural monument in Latvia.

Perimeter: 10.4 m, height: 18.0 m, projection of the crown: 250 m², length of branches: up to 13.7 m.

It is the thickest tree in Latvia and in all Baltic States.

History 
Natural Monument Researcher Guntis Eniņš claims that Kaive Oak is almost 400 years old, not 800-1000 years,
as claimed in some sources, based on the 3 mm tree annual or 2.5 cm average annual increase in stem thickness.  In 1920s during agrarian reform in Latvia land of Kaive Manor was divided into 32 farms. Land with the Kaive oak become the property of J. Stroman, who named his farm the Senči (Ancestors)." Lightning struck at the top of the tree in the 1920s, leaving on oak only one large branch. The first publication in the press about this oak is in Nedēļa (Week) magazine on October 30, 1924:

Eniņš, however, rejects the possibility that such a great oak could have grown in the woods and that the landlord's fields could have been an "ancient site of sacrifice."

References

Individual oak trees
Natural monuments of Latvia
Individual trees in Latvia
Tukums Municipality